Thomas Casey may refer to:

Thomas Casey (Kilmallock MP) (1765–1840), Irish politician
Thomas Lincoln Casey Sr. (1831–1896), United States Army Corps of Engineers
Thomas Lincoln Casey Jr. (1857–1925), American expert in coleoptera and son of Thomas Lincoln Casey Sr.
Thomas S. Casey (1832–1891), American judge and politician
Thomas Worrall Casey (1869–1949), British Liberal Member of Parliament
Tommy Casey (baseball), 19th-century American baseball pitcher
Tom Casey (Australian politician) (1921–2003), South Australian MHA and MLC
Tom Casey (Canadian football) (1924–2002), Canadian football player for Winnipeg Blue Bombers
Tommy Casey (1930–2009), Northern Irish footballer
Tom Casey (diplomat), American diplomat